Philip Granville Short, known as Phil Short (born January 31, 1947), is a retired military officer formerly from Covington, Louisiana, USA, who served in the Louisiana State Senate for District 12 (St. Helena, St. Tammany, Tangipahoa, and Washington parishes) from 1996 to 1999.

References

External links

1947 births
Baptists from Virginia
Republican Party Louisiana state senators
People from Covington, Louisiana
Politicians from Shreveport, Louisiana
Virginia Republicans
People from Spotsylvania County, Virginia
United States Marine Corps officers
American real estate businesspeople
American real estate brokers
C. E. Byrd High School alumni
Louisiana Tech University alumni
Webster University alumni
Living people
Baptists from Louisiana
20th-century American politicians